Patrick Lin is a Hong Kong–born cinematographer and layout artist who works for Pixar. He was the director of photography on The Incredibles (2004), Up (2009), Inside Out (2015) and Toy Story 4 (2019).

Early life
Lin was born and raised in British Hong Kong, where he attended St. Paul's Co-educational College. He moved to Canada at the age of 15, and later moved again to San Francisco to attend the California College of Arts, where he completed a Bachelor of Fine Arts in film and video.

Career
Lin's first credited job in the film industry was as a camera and lighting assistant on James and the Giant Peach (1996). He later worked as a motion control photographer on Wag the Dog (1997), The Truman Show (1998) and X-Men (2000). He also worked as a location manager for Radio Television Hong Kong, assisting the company with filming in the United States.

Lin has worked at Pixar since he first joined in September 1997 as a layout artist on A Bug's Life (1998). He was the director of photography on The Incredibles (2004) and Up (2009), and a lead layout artist on Monsters, Inc. (2001) and Ratatouille (2007). He was also a contributing layout artist on Brave (2012) and Monsters University (2013). In 2015, Lin was the cinematographer on Pixar's Inside Out; his full credited title was "director of photography – camera and staging". On Inside Out, he pioneered Pixar's first use of a virtual camera lens based on an actual camera lens, so that the animation appears to be filmed on an actual camera. He later served as a layout artist on The Good Dinosaur (2015) and director of photography on Toy Story 4 (2019). In total, he has worked on over twenty Pixar projects, including feature films and short films.

References

External links

Living people
Pixar people
Hong Kong cinematographers
Hong Kong emigrants to the United States
California College of the Arts alumni
Alumni of St. Paul's Co-educational College
Year of birth missing (living people)